Nyla Usha Gopakumar is an Indian actress, television host, and radio jockey from Trivandrum, Kerala. After working for nearly a decade as an RJ at Hit 96.7 in Dubai, she made her acting debut in 2013 with Kunjananthante Kada.

Early life

Nyla was born to Gopakumar and Usha Kumari in Al Ain, United Arab Emirates. She did her schooling at the Holy Angel's Convent Trivandrum and pursued her college education at All Saints College, Thiruvananthapuram. In 2004, she moved to Dubai and joined the radio station Hit 96.7 where she worked as a radio jockey.

Career 

In 2013, Nyla Usha debuted in the Malayalam film industry with Salim Ahamed's Kunjananthante Kada, opposite Mammootty. Ahamed had known Nyla since she had interviewed him on several occasions in Dubai and offered her the lead female role. She played Chithira, a woman who is going through an unhappy marriage.

Later that year she had her second release, Punyalan Agarbattis, in which she played "a vibrant girl, similar to the real me". Since she could relate herself to the character, she used her own looks and costumes in the film. Although she had a major role in Kunjananthante Kada she said that it was her role in Punyalan Agarbathis that fetched her recognition.

She played the female lead in Aashiq Abu's 2014 crime film Gangster and Deepu Karunakaran's 2015 thriller Fireman. From 2016 to 2017, she hosted the Malayalam version of Minute to Win It in Mazhavil Manorama. She essayed the role of Effymol in Diwanjimoola Grand Prix in 2018. In 2019, she had two releases, Prithviraj Sukumaran-directed action drama Lucifer, in which she played a TV channel executive, and Joshiy-directed action drama Porinju Mariam Jose, in which she played Mariam, one of the three title characters. Both the films were commercial successes.

Filmography 

All films are in Malayalam language unless otherwise noted.

Films

Television

Awards

References

External links 

 
 Nyla Usha in Box Office Noon

Indian radio presenters
Living people
Actresses from Thiruvananthapuram
Actresses in Malayalam cinema
Indian film actresses
Year of birth missing (living people)
Actresses in Malayalam television
Indian television actresses
21st-century Indian actresses
Indian women radio presenters
Female models from Thiruvananthapuram